The 1961 Marshall Thundering Herd football team was an American football team that represented Marshall University in the Mid-American Conference (MAC) during the 1961 NCAA College Division football season. In its third season under head coach Charlie Snyder, the team compiled a 2–7–1 record (1–4 against conference opponents), finished in sixth place out of seven teams in the MAC, and was outscored by a total of 183 to 62. Ralph May and Rucker Wickline were the team captains. The team played its home games at Fairfield Stadium in Huntington, West Virginia.

Schedule

References

Marshall
Marshall Thundering Herd football seasons
Marshall Thundering Herd football